Panela or rapadura is an unrefined whole cane sugar, typical of Central and Latin America. It is a solid form of sucrose derived from the boiling and evaporation of sugarcane juice. Panela is known by other names in Latin America, such as chancaca in Chile, Bolivia, and Peru, piloncillo in Mexico (where panela refers to a type of cheese, queso panela). Just like brown sugar, two varieties of piloncillo are available; one is lighter (blanco) and one darker (oscuro). Unrefined, it is commonly used in Mexico, where it has been around for at least 500 years. Made from crushed sugar cane, the juice is collected, boiled, and poured into molds, where it hardens into blocks. Elsewhere in the world, the word jaggery describes a similar foodstuff. Both are considered non-centrifugal cane sugars.

Panela is sold in many forms, including liquid, granulated, and solid blocks, and is used in the canning of foods, as well as in confectionery, soft drinks, baking, and vinegar, beer, and winemaking.

Regional names

 Chancaca in Bolivia, Chile and Peru; also the name of a sweet sauce made from this

 Dulce de panela or dulce de atado in El Salvador
 Đường phên in Vietnam

 Gura in Afghanistan
 Gurr in Pakistan

 Jaggery, Bella (ಬೆಲ್ಲ), Gur, Sharkara, or Vellam  in India

 Nam oy in Laos

 Panela in Colombia, Ecuador, and Venezuela
 Panocha in the Mexican State of Sinaloa
 Papelón in Venezuela
 Piloncillo ("little pylon", so named for the cone shape)  in Mexico and Spain

 Rapadou in Haiti
 Rapadura in Argentina, Brazil, Cuba, Guatemala, Honduras, Panama, Paraguay, and the Dominican Republic
 Raspadura in Cuba, Ecuador, and Panama

 Tapa de dulce or Dulce (de tapa) in Costa Rica and Nicaragua

Economics 

The main producer of panela is Colombia (about 1.4 million tons/year), where panela production is one of the most important economic activities, with the highest index of panela consumption per capita worldwide. Panela is also produced in Ecuador, Guatemala, Mexico, Panama, Peru, Chile, Venezuela, Brazil, and Bolivia (where it is called chankaka or empanizao).

In Colombia, the panela industry is an important source of employment, with about 350,000 people working in nearly 20,000 trapiches (panela farms). In 2003, Colombian sugarcane contributed 4.2% of the value of agricultural production (not counting coffee) and 1.9% of national agricultural activity of that country. That year, it was ninth in contributions to production value.

Similarly, it represents 10.7% of the area for permanent crops and 6.2% of the total area cultivated in Colombia, sixth place among the country's crops, behind only coffee, corn, rice, bananas, and cotton. This product is produced predominantly in the rural economy, the basic economy of 236 municipalities in 12 national departments.

An estimated 70,000 farm units cultivate sugarcane for mills, which generate more than 25 million annually in wages, employing around 350,000 people, or 12% of the economically active rural population, making it the second-largest employer after agricultural coffee production.

To the extent it is a low-cost sweetener with important contributions of minerals and trace amounts of vitamins, high intake occurs mainly in strata. Panela consumption represents 2.18% of expenditures on food and in some areas accounts for up to 9% of food expenditures in low-income sectors.

Uses 
Panela was originally created as an easier way to transport sugar.

It is used to make chancaca. In Peru, chancaca is used in typical food such as champús, picarones, calabaza al horno, and mazamorra cochina. In Costa Rica, it is used in preparations such as tapa de dulce and agua de sapo. In Chile, it is used for sweet sopaipillas.

A very common use of panela in Colombia is for aguapanela, one of its most widely consumed beverages, and an important source of calories for working people, especially in rural areas. It is also used in the preparation of guarapo and various desserts. Since it is a very solid block, some Colombian homes have a hard river stone (la piedra de la panela) to break the panela into smaller, more manageable pieces. Panela can be purchased in markets, local grocers, and online stores. In parts of coastal Colombia, it is also used for chancacas.

Known as piloncillo in México, it is most often seen in the shape of small, truncated cones. Many Mexican desserts are made with piloncillo, such as atole, capirotada, champurrado, and flan. It is also blended with different spices, such as anise, cayenne, or chocolate.

In the Philippines, panocha or in Tagalog panutsá, is traditionally used as an ingredient for latík and kalamay, as well as a comfort food eaten straight.

In Venezuela, it is an essential ingredient for many typical recipes, although production of panela in the country dropped precipitously across the 20th century.

Health claims
Panela manufacturers and advocates claim the substance to be healthier than refined sugar, suggesting it has immunological benefits, a lower glycemic index, and higher micronutrient content. As the authors of The Ultimate Guide to Sugars and Sweeteners point out, "it's still sugar", with only a trace amount more vitamins and minerals, and little research to support other claims.

Patent
In May 2019, the following patent was issued, claiming health benefits achieved by a particular method of processing raw sugarcane:

National Panela Pageant 
The National Panela Pageant takes place in the town of Villeta, Cundinamarca, in Colombia. This town is famous for its production of sugarcane, but the festivities occur in almost all national departments of Colombia in January of each year. The festival has been celebrated since 1977 as a tribute to the hard work and craftsmanship with which the people of the region make panela. It creates a sense of regional and national unity and the sharing of a common bond. Each year, a National Queen is crowned, on the basis of beauty, popularity, and knowledge about the production and marketing of panela.

Gallery

See also
Caramelization
Palm sugar
Papelón con limón, a drink made with panela
Peen tong, a Chinese slab brown sugar and sugar candy

References

External links

Agriculture in Colombia
Colombian cuisine
Economy of Colombia
Ecuadorian cuisine
Food technology
Latin American cuisine
Mexican cuisine
Sugars
Sugar production